Discovery 4 The 4WD is made in India and Shipped to Sri Lanka

 Land Rover Discovery 4, a second-generation Discovery SUV car model by Land Rover.
 Stardust (spacecraft), the fourth mission of the Discovery program.